Kerala Electrical & Allied Engineering Co. Ltd., also known as KEL, is one among the largest productive public sector undertaking, fully owned company by the Government of Kerala. The company was founded in 1964 and is based in Kochi, India.

History 
The company started its first operation in 1964 by incorporating technology from the French firm EVR for the manufacturing of brushless alternators, required for Indian Railways in lighting & air-conditioning of coaches. KEL owns five production units for the development of a number of equipment for Indian Army, Indian Air Force, Indian Space Research Organization and many other space research institutions.

Divisions 
KEL owns five divisions located in four districts of Kerala.
 Train Lighting Alternator Division Kundara Unit in Kollam District.	
 Transformer Division Mamala Unit
and,
 Structural Division Mamala Unit in Ernakulam District.
 LT Switchgear Division Olavakkod Unit in Palakkad District.
 Cast Resin Transformer Division
Edarikode Unit in Malappuram District.

Train Lighting Alternator Division 
This unit is in Kundara, Kollam district and is the first unit of KEL started in the year 1964, based on technical know-how acquired from EVR of France, for the purpose of manufacturing brushless alternators.

Transformer Division 
The division established in 1969 at Mamala, about 15 km from Kochi. This unit was initiated with technical assistance from Bharat Heavy Electricals to manufacture distribution transformers. Now it is one of the major players in the transformer industry. This unit is one of the first transformer industry in Kerala to obtain BIS certification for distribution transformers and first few in India to get ISO 9001 certification.

Structural Division 
The Structural Engineering Division of KEL Mamala Unit, specializes in the design, fabrication and commissioning of hydraulic gates and hoists and their regulatory utilities used in dams for power and irrigation projects. The expert areas of the KEL Structural Division located at the Malama unit in Ernakulam district are the design, fabrication and commissioning of hydraulic gates, hoists and their regulatory utilities for power generation / irrigation needs.

LT Switchgear Division 
The Switchgear division located in Olavakkod in Palakkad district started operational in 1977 with technical knowledge adopted from UNELEC, a French company. This unit manufactures isolators / changeovers, switch fuses, fuse units / cutouts, distribution fuse boards / panels and castings used for industrial, commercial and domestic applications through their LT Switchgear Division.

Cast Resin Transformer Division 
In 2010 semi-automated manufacturing and testing facility was established at Edarikode in Malappuram District for manufacture Dry type transformers
. KEL's Edarikkod unit was commercially operational since January 2010 and had already sold more than 2,400 units of 100-kVA distribution transformers worth Rs 24 crore to KSEB.

Major projects

References

External links 
 Official website of KEL
 PSU of Kerala Government - KEL

Companies based in Kochi
Indian companies established in 1964
Government-owned companies of Kerala
Engineering companies of India
1964 establishments in Kerala